General Butler State Resort Park is a state park located near Carrollton, Kentucky in Carroll County. The park is named for General William O. Butler, a soldier in both the War of 1812 and the Mexican–American War. The  park features a lodge, cabins and campground, fishing and canoeing on Butler Lake, trails for hiking and mountain biking.

Butler-Turpin State Historic House
The Butler-Turpin State Historic House, also known as the Butler House, is located in the park and is open to the public as a historic house museum. The home was built in 1859 in the Greek Revival style. It contains original furniture and original documents and other family objects. The grounds and family cemetery are also open. Guided tours are available April through mid-November.

Activities and amenities
 Accommodations: The park has a 53-room lodge with swimming pool, cottages, and a 111-site campground.
 Trails: More than five miles of trails are offered for hiking and mountain biking.
 Fishing and paddle-boating are available on 30-acre Butler Lake.
 Ski area: The park formerly hosted a ski area, Ski Butler!, which opened in 1981 and closed during the winter of 1997–98.

References

External links
 General Butler State Resort Park Kentucky Department of Parks
 Butler-Turpin State Historic House Kentucky Department of Parks

State parks of Kentucky
Protected areas of Carroll County, Kentucky
1931 establishments in Kentucky
Protected areas established in 1931